Tokharistan (formed from "Tokhara" and the suffix -stan meaning "place of" in Persian) is an ancient Early Middle Ages name given to the area which was known as Bactria in Ancient Greek sources.

In the 7th and 8th century CE, Tokharistan came under the rule of the Chinese Empire, administered by the Protectorate General to Pacify the West. Today, Tokharistan is fragmented between Uzbekistan, Tajikistan and Afghanistan.

Names of Tokharistan
Several languages have used variations of the word "Tokhara" to designate the region:

 Tokharistan may appear in ancient Indian sources as the Kingdom of Tushara, to the northwest of the Indian subcontinent. "Tushara" is the Sanskrit word for "snowy" "frigid", and is known to have been used to designate the country of Tukhara. In Sanskrit, it became तुखार (Tukhāra).
 In ancient Greek, the name was Tokharoi or Thaguroi.
 Tochari for Latin historians.
 The name "Tokhara" appeared in the 4th century CE, in Buddhist texts, such as the Vibhasa-sastra. 
 In Tibetan, the name for the region was Thod-kar or Tho-gar.
 The name appears in Chinese as Tukhara (覩货罗 Duhuoluo or 吐火罗 Tuhuoluo). "Tokhara" was known in Chinese sources as Tuhuluo (吐呼羅), which is first mentioned during the Northern Wei era (386-534 CE). In the Tang dynasty, the name is transcribed as Tuhuoluo (土豁羅). Other Chinese names are Doushaluo 兜沙羅, Douquluo 兜佉羅 or Duhuoluo 覩貨羅.
 In Khotanese, Ttaugara; in Uigurian, Twghry; in Armenian, T'ukri-k'.

Ethnicities
Several portraits of ambassadors from the region of Tokharistan are known from the Portraits of Periodical Offering of Liang, originally painted in 526–539 CE. They were at that time under the overlordship of the Hephthalites, who led the embassies to the Southern Liang court in the early 6th century CE.

"Tocharians" in the Tarim Basin
The name of "Tocharians" was mistakenly applied by early 20th century authors to the Indo-European people of the Tarim Basin, from the areas of Kucha and Agni. These scholars erroneously believed that these Indo-Europeans had originated in Tokharistan (Bactria), and hence applied the term "Tocharians" to them. This appellation remains in common usage although the Indo-European people of the Tarim Basin probably referred to themselves as Agni, Kuči and Krorän.

Chinese sources
In the Nestorian Stele of Xi'an, erected in 781 CE, the East Syriac Christian monk Adam, author of the stele, mentioned in Syriac that his grandfather was a missionary-priest from Balkh  in Tokharistan.

Geography

Geographically, Tokharistan corresponds to the upper Oxus valley, between the mountain ranges of the Hindu-Kush to the south and the Pamir-Alay to the north. The area reaches west as far as the Badakshan mountains, south as far as Bamiyan. Arab sources considered Kabul as part of the southern border of Tokharistan, and Shaganiyan as part of its northern border. In a narrow sense, Tokharistan may only refer to the region south of the Oxus. The region used the East Iranian Bactrian language, which was current from the 2nd to the 9th century CE.

The most important city of Tokharistan was Balkh, which was at the center of the trade between Iran (the Sasanian Empire) and India.

The region of Tokharistan had been outside of Sasanian control for the three centuries preceding the Muslim conquest of Persia in 633–651 CE. During that time, Tokharistan was under the rule of dynasties of Hunnish or Turkic origin, such as the Kidarites, the Alchon Huns and the Hephthalites. At the time of the Arab conquest, Tokharistan was under the control of the Western Turks, through the Tokhara Yabghus.

Art of early medieval Tokharistan
Numerous artefacts exist from the art of early medieval Tokharistan, which shows influence from the Buddhist art of Gandhara.

5th–6th century CE
Many authors have suggested that the figures in the Dilberjin Tepe or Balalyk Tepe paintings are characteristic of the Hephthalites (450–570 CE). In this context, parallels have been drawn with the figures from Kizil Caves in Chinese Turkestan, which seem to wear broadly similar clothing. The paintings of Balalyk Tepe would be characteristic of the court life of the Hephthalites in the first half of the 6th century CE, before the arrival of the Turks.

7th century CE
In painting, there is "Tokharistan school of art" with examples from Kalai Kafirnigan, Kafyr Kala or Ajina Tepe, as Buddhism and Buddhist art enjoyed a renaissance, possibly owing to the sponsorships and religious tolerance of the Western Turks (Tokhara Yabghus).

Samanids and Ghaznavids 10–11th century
Islamic art developed with the Samanid Empire and the Ghaznavids from the 10th to 12th century CE.

References

Bactria
Historical regions of China
Historical regions of Afghanistan
Historical regions
Regions of Tajikistan
Regions of Uzbekistan
States and territories disestablished in the 8th century
States and territories established in the 4th century